José María Caro Rodríguez (June 23, 1866 – December 4, 1958) was a Chilean Cardinal of the Roman Catholic Church. He served as Archbishop of Santiago from 1939 until his death, and was elevated to the cardinalate in 1946 by Pope Pius XII.

Biography

Early life and ordination
José María Caro was born in Los Valles, San Fernando department, in current Pichilemu commune, as the fourth of the nine children of José María Caro Martínez, former Mayor of Pichilemu, and his wife Rita Rodríguez Cornejo. After attending a local school, he entered the seminary in Santiago in 1881. Caro then went to Rome in 1887, studying at the Pontifical Collegio Pio-Latinoamericano and the Pontifical Gregorian University until 1891. Ordained to the priesthood on December 20, 1890, he returned to Chile in October 1891 and then taught preparatory studies and philosophy at the Santiago seminary.

Pastoral work
Caro carried out his pastoral ministry in several chaplaincies, hospitals and parishes, also serving as pastor of Mamiña from March to December 1899. He returned to the seminary in 1900 as Professor of Theology.

Bishop
Appointed Apostolic Vicar of Tarapacá on May 6, 1911, Caro was made Titular Bishop of Mylasa in association with the vicariate on January 5, 1912. He received his episcopal consecration on the following April 28 from Archbishop Enrico Sibilia, with Bishops Luis Izquierdo Vargas and Miguel Claro Vásquez serving as co-consecrators, in the metropolitan cathedral of Santiago.

Caro was later named Bishop of La Serena on December 14, 1925, and was advanced to the rank of Archbishop upon his diocese's elevation on May 20, 1939. On August 28 of that same year, Pope Pius XII made him Archbishop of Santiago.

As a bishop, Caro was strongly opposed to the influence of Freemasonry in modern society and wrote several anti-Masonic pamphlets, one of the best known being The Mystery of Freemasonry Unveiled.

Cardinal
He was created Cardinal Priest of S. Maria della Scala by Pius XII in the consistory of February 18, 1946. Caro, the first Chilean member of the College of Cardinals, served as papal legate to the Chilean Plenary Council on September 8, 1946, tenth National Eucharistic Congress on September 26, 1951, and later to the sixth Interamerican Congress of Catholic Education on August 30, 1956. Before participating in the 1958 papal conclave, Caro attended the first general conference of the Latin American Episcopal Conference in Rio de Janeiro, Brazil, in 1955.

Death
Caro died in Santiago, at age 92, as the eldest member of the College of Cardinals. He was initially buried in the archiepiscopal crypt of the Santiago Cathedral, but his remains were moved to a funeral chapel at the back of the cathedral's central nave on March 19, 1968.

References

External links
Cardinals of the Holy Roman Church
Catholic-Hierarchy

1866 births
1958 deaths
Chilean cardinals
Chilean people of Basque descent
20th-century Roman Catholic archbishops in Chile
People from Pichilemu
Cardinals created by Pope Pius XII
Roman Catholic archbishops of Santiago de Chile
Catholicism and Freemasonry
Pontifical Gregorian University alumni
Jose Maria, Jr.
Grand Crosses 1st class of the Order of Merit of the Federal Republic of Germany
Roman Catholic bishops of Iquique
Roman Catholic archbishops of La Serena